Local door operation refers to a procedure and system in place on railway rolling stock on the United Kingdom railway network. It is where a single door on a train is operated by its train crew from a crew operated switch, often on a train door control panel operated by the train's guard. This differs from the Emergency Door Release or Egress that can be used by the general public in case of an emergency, this usually requires a cover to be removed or broken to operate and would never usually be used in the normal course of a journey.

Location and operation
The location of the local door varies and is usual in multiple locations on the train, and sometimes does not require a switch to operate in the case of outside doors to Brake Vans or Driving Van Trailers for example.

It is used to allow train crew to access the train without the use of the general passenger doors or for use in the Guards dispatch duties leaving a station. The public are not permitted to use this device and it should be impossible for a member of the public to access it. Brake Van doors and control panel covers for instance require keys to open, and in the case of door control panels require another key to prime them for use. Local door switches in the open position while disarmed usually activate the train's emergency braking systems; this prevents a door from opening by accident when a crew member arms the control while in motion.

Onboard trains
On coaching stock trains fitted with central door locking (slam door), there is no ‘local door’ except on the train's Guard's van. Local instructions allow the Guard to operate train doors from any location it is safe to do so, or where regulations require them to do so. Once it is required, the Guard can lock all doors without requiring to close their door, as the locking bolt does not activate until the door is closed. Coaching stock trains with power doors, like the Mark 4 used on the East Coast Main Line, have local door switches at all door control panel locations.

All multiple unit trains have local door switches, located in various locations. These are always located on cab doors which can be locked for security. Most of the rest are located on door control panels and require the Guard open their local door and step onto the platform before opening the remaining passenger doors, thus making sure their train is accommodated correctly on the platform. In some cases, where the driver releases the doors, the Guard uses a switch to isolate their door from the rest to prevent it closing when the other passenger doors are closed. The Guard will observe the doors closing, and is required to remain on the platform until all doors are closed and it is safe to proceed. They will then will close their door before starting the train.

See also
 Selective door operation

Passenger rail transport in the United Kingdom
Passenger rail rolling stock